Manakish, or in singular form man'ousheh, or other spellings, sometimes called , is a popular Levantine food consisting of dough topped with thyme, cheese, or ground meat. Similar to a pizza, it can be sliced or folded, and it can be served either for breakfast or lunch.

Traditionally, women would bake dough in a communal oven in the morning, to provide their family with their daily bread needs, and would prepare smaller portions of dough with different toppings for breakfast at this time.

Manakish are popular across the Levant, and can also be found in neighboring regions, and centers of Levantine emigration.

Etymology
The word manaqish is the plural of the Arabic word manqūshah (from the root verb naqasha 'to sculpt, carve out' or engrave), meaning that after the dough has been rolled flat, it is pressed by the fingertips to create little dips for the topping to lie in.

Classic toppings
Za'atar. The most popular form of manakish uses za'atar (ground dried thyme, oregano, marjoram or some combination thereof, mixed with toasted sesame seeds, salt, and other spices such as sumac) as a topping. The za'atar is mixed with olive oil and spread onto the dough before being baked in the oven. Za'atar manakish is a breakfast favorite in Levantine cuisine. It is also served as part of a mezze, or as a snack with a glass of mint tea and feta cheese on the side.
Cheese. There are two main types of cheese used on manakish: akkawi and kashkaval. Za'atar is occasionally added to cheese manakish to enhance its flavor.
Minced lamb also called sfiha. Manakish topped with lamb are served for lunch due to their heavier contents. The minced lamb is mixed with tiny pieces of diced tomato and vegetable oil, and the manakish is optionally served with ground pepper or pickles and yogurt.
Chili ( or ).
Kashk. This Iranian staple is a mixture of fermented drained or dried yogurt and finely ground wheat that can be used by itself or in combination with other toppings, such as walnuts or onions, spread onto the bread.
Spinach, Swiss chard.

See also

Khachapuri
Feteer meshaltet
Musakhan
Matnakash, a flat bread from Armenia. While the word may be related to manakish, matnakash is plain (no topping)

References

Arab cuisine
Levantine cuisine
Mediterranean cuisine